Changkat Jong is a state constituency in Perak, Malaysia, that has been represented in the Perak State Legislative Assembly.

Demographics

History

Polling districts
According to the federal gazette issued on 30 March 2018, the Changkat Jong constituency is divided into 18 polling districts.

Representation history

Election Results

References 

</ref>

Perak state constituencies